Aframomum sceleratum is a species of plant in the ginger family, Zingiberaceae. It was first described by Auguste Jean Baptiste Chevalier.

References 

sceleratum